El Hadji Diouf (born 20 August 1988) is a Senegalese footballer, who is currently playing for FC Zenit Čáslav in the Czech 2. Liga.

Career 

Discovered by AEK's Dutch scout Eugene Gerrards, the young Senegalese midfielder left local club ASC Xam-Xam for AEK Athens F.C. in 2007. Diouf began playing with the youth team and has been on four loan stints. He made his senior team debut for AEK on February 25, 2009 against Skoda Xanthi in the Greek Cup quarter-finals. Coming on in the 80th minute he provided a much needed spark off the bench which led to AEK scoring the winning goal. He made his league debut three days later, again, against Skoda Xanthi.

References

External links 
 
 
 

1988 births
Living people
Footballers from Dakar
Senegalese footballers
Serer sportspeople
Association football midfielders
Super League Greece players
Primeira Liga players
ASC Xam-Xam players
AEK Athens F.C. players
Vitória F.C. players
Szombathelyi Haladás footballers
Ilisiakos F.C. players
Anagennisi Karditsa F.C. players
FC Botoșani players
FK Čáslav players
Senegalese expatriate footballers
Senegalese expatriate sportspeople in Greece
Senegalese expatriate sportspeople in Portugal
Senegalese expatriate sportspeople in Hungary
Senegalese expatriate sportspeople in Romania
Senegalese expatriate sportspeople in the Czech Republic
Expatriate footballers in Greece
Expatriate footballers in Portugal
Expatriate footballers in Hungary
Expatriate footballers in Romania
Expatriate footballers in the Czech Republic